Paul Frank Bender (February 12, 1896 – December 4, 1992) was an American football and wrestling coach. He served as the head football coach at Iowa State Teachers College—now known as the University of Northern Iowa—from 1925 to 1929, compiling a record of 25–9–6. Bender was as the head wrestling coach at Iowa State Teachers from 1922 to 1930.

Head coaching record

College football

References

External links
 University of Northern Iowa profile
 

1896 births
1992 deaths
Northern Iowa Panthers football coaches
Northern Iowa Panthers wrestling coaches
High school football coaches in Iowa
People from Lee County, Iowa